Look In My Heart is Alyssa Milano's first album, released March 21, 1989, when she was 16 years old. It was also released as a Color Picture Label CD and later as a 24Krt Gold Edition, which comes with a bonus track "Look In My Heart" (extended dance remix) identical to the version on The Best In The World album. Videos were filmed for the three singles that were released. A VHS video was also released entitled Look in My Heart that included the three videos and a short documentary, "Alyssa's Backstage Memories". After the credits roll, Alyssa's Japanese commercial for pasta can be seen—she is singing "Look In My Heart" in the commercial.

Track listing
"Look in My Heart" (Joey Carbone, Dennis Belfield) - 3:30
"What a Feeling" (Joey Carbone, Dennis Belfield) - 3:47
"Da Doo Ron Ron/Magic in Your Eyes - Medley" (Jeff Barry, Phil Spector, Ellie Greenwich/Joey Carbone, Tom Milano) - 4:32
"You Lied to Me" (Joey Carbone, Tom Milano) - 3:50
"Kimi Wa Sunshine Boy" (Brian Richy, Mark Davis) - 3:27
"Born to Love" (Fonny De Wulf) - 3:11
"Waiting for My Star" (Joey Carbone, Tom Milano,  Mark Davis) - 4:52
"Straight to the Top" (Joey Carbone, Dennis Belfield) - 3:21
"Look in My Heart" [Extended Dance Remix]* (Joey Carbone, Dennis Belfield) - 6:07

* bonus track on 24Krt Gold version only

Singles

Personnel
The following people are credited on the album:

Dennis Belfield – drum and synthesizer programming
Joey Carbone – arranger, producer, synthesizers
Debra Devis – background vocals
Mark Davis – arranger, additional instruments
Fonny De Wulf – additional instruments, engineer, producer
Ford Models Japan –agency
John Goux –guitar
Ross Hogarth – engineer
Leslie Ann Jones – engineer, mixing
Harry Kaneko – executive producer
Sam Kazama – album notes, art direction, management
Gail Lennon – background vocals
Tampa Lann – background vocals
Sammy Masada – associate executive producer

Alyssa Milano – background vocals
Tom Milano – arranger, executive producer, synthesizers, drum and synthesizer programming
Kaz Miyake – design
Katz Nagasawa – producer
Michael O'Connor – management, photography
Bill Purse – engineer, synthesizers, drum and synthesizer programming
Brian Reeves – mixing
Tom Sassa – assistant to executive producer
Masa Shigeno – assistant to executive producer
Bill Smith – engineer
David Woodford – tenor and baritone sax

Charts

References

Alyssa Milano albums
1989 albums
Pony Canyon albums